Scaevola crassifolia is a shrub in the family Goodeniaceae, native to Western Australia and South Australia. Common names include cushion fanflower, thick-leaved fanflower and thick-leaved scaevola. It grows up to 1.5 metres high and 3 metres wide and produces white, blue or pale purple flowers from July to February in its native range.

The similarity to Scaevola nitida is very close - the difference being S. nitida is a larger shrub with thinner leaves.

References

crassifolia
Flora of South Australia
Eudicots of Western Australia
Asterales of Australia